The G1 Climax 31 was a professional wrestling tournament promoted by New Japan Pro-Wrestling (NJPW). The tournament commenced on September 18 and concluded on October 21, 2021. It is the thirty-first edition of G1 Climax, and forty-seventh edition of the tournament counting its previous forms under different names. B block winner Kazuchika Okada defeated A Block winner Kota Ibushi by referee stoppage after Ibushi suffered an arm injury when he attempted to perform a Phoenix Splash on Okada, forcing referee Red Shoes Unno to stop the match.

Considered NJPW's most important tournament, the G1 Climax features twenty wrestlers, divided in two blocks of ten ("A" and "B"). Each participant faces all nine other wrestlers within the same block in singles matches. The winner of each block is determined via a point system, with two points for a win, one point for a draw, and no points for a defeat. Each night of the event sees the ten members of one block compete. On the final day of the event, the winners of each block face each other to determine the winner of the tournament, who also receives a future match for the IWGP World Heavyweight Championship at Wrestle Kingdom. The event is broadcast live on TV Asahi and Fighting TV Samurai in Japan, and New Japan Pro-Wrestling World worldwide.

The event saw the G1 Climax debut of Great-O-Khan, Tanga Loa, and Chase Owens. Tetsuya Naito suffered a legitimate knee injury during his match against Zack Sabre Jr. in the tournament's opening night, forcing him to forfeit the remainder of his matches.

Production

Tournament rules 
The tournament features twenty wrestlers, divided in two blocks of ten ("A" and "B"). Each participant faces all nine other wrestler within the same block in singles matches, with the winner of each block being determined via a point system, gaining two points for a win, one point for a draw, and no point for a loss; each night of the event sees the ten members of a same block compete for the tournament. In case of several wrestler sharing the top score, the results of the matches those wrestlers had when facing each other in the tournament act as tiebreaker, with the one having the most wins over the other top-scorers determining the winner of the block.

On the final day of the event, the respective winners of both blocks face each other to determine the winner of the G1 Climax, who would gain a future match for the IWGP Heavyweight Championship, NJPW's top championship, at Wrestle Kingdom, NJPW's biggest yearly event; if the IWGP Heavyweight Champion himself wins, he gets to pick his opponent at Wrestle Kingdom. The Young Lion matches have a fifteen-minutes time limit, while the matches of the tournament have a 30-minutes time limit (with the time limit being reached resulting in a tie); the final match between the two block winners has no time limit.

History 
On July 8, 2021, NJPW announced that the 2021 edition of the G1 Climax would take place from September to October due to 2020 Summer Olympics was delayed to 2021. During night 2 of Wrestle Grand Slam in MetLife Dome on September 5, NJPW announced the full tournament bracket for the G1 Climax.

Storylines 
The event includes matches that result from scripted storylines, where wrestlers portray heroes, villains, or less distinguishable characters in scripted events that build tension and culminate in a wrestling match or series of matches.

Venues

Matches

Night 1 (A Block) 
The first night of A Block took place on September 18, 2021, at Osaka Prefectural Gymnasium in Namba, Osaka. Tetsuya Naito legitimately injured his knee during his match on Night 1 and had to withdraw from the rest of the competition as a result.

Tournament scores

Night 2 (B Block) 
The first night of B Block took place on September 19, 2021, at Osaka Prefectural Gymnasium in Namba, Osaka.

Tournament scores

Night 3 (A Block) 
The second night of A Block took place on September 23, 2021, at Ota City General Gymnasium in Ōta, Tokyo.

Tournament scores

Night 4 (B Block) 
The second night of B Block took place on September 24, 2021, at Ota City General Gymnasium in Ōta, Tokyo.

Tournament scores

Night 5 (A Block) 
The third night of A Block took place on September 26, 2021, at World Memorial Hall in Chūō-ku, Kobe.

Tournament scores

Night 6 (B Block) 
The third night of B Block took place on September 29, 2021, at Korakuen Hall in Bunkyo, Tokyo.

Tournament scores

Night 7 (A Block) 
The fourth night of A Block took place on September 30, 2021, at Korakuen Hall in Bunkyo, Tokyo.

Tournament scores

Night 8 (B Block) 
The fourth night of B Block took place on October 1, 2021, at Hamamatsu Arena in Hamamatsu, Shizuoka.

Tournament scores

Night 9 (A Block) 
The fifth night of A Block took place on October 3, 2021, at Aichi Prefectural Gymnasium in Naka-ku, Nagoya.

Tournament scores

Night 10 (B Block) 
The fifth night of B Block took place on October 4, 2021, at Korakuen Hall in Bunkyo, Tokyo.

Tournament scores

Night 11 (A Block) 
The sixth night of the A Block took place on October 7, 2021, at Hiroshima Sun Plaza in Nishi-ku, Hiroshima.

Tournament scores

Night 12 (B Block) 
The sixth night of the B Block took place on October 8, 2021, at Kochi Prefectural Gymnasium in Kochi, Kochi.

Tournament scores

Night 13 (A Block) 
The seventh night of A Block took place on October 9, 2021, at Osaka Prefectural Gymnasium in Namba, Osaka.

Tournament scores

Night 14 (B Block) 
The seventh night of B Block took place on October 12, 2021, at Xebio Arena Sendai in Sendai, Miyagi.

Tournament scores

Night 15 (A Block) 
The eighth night of A Block took place on October 13, 2021, at Xebio Arena Sendai in Sendai, Miyagi.

Tournament scores

Night 16 (B Block) 
The eighth night of B Block took place on October 14, 2021, at Yamagata City General Sports Center in Tendo, Yamagata.

Tournament scores

Night 17 (A Block Final) 
The ninth night of A Block took place on October 18, 2021, at Yokohama Budokan in Naka-ku, Yokohama.

Tournament scores

Night 18 (B Block Final) 
The ninth night of B Block took place on October 20, 2021, at Nippon Budokan in Chiyoda-ku, Tokyo.

Tournament scores

Night 19 (Final) 
The final night took place on October 21, 2021, at Nippon Budokan in Chiyoda-ku, Tokyo.

Participants
On Night 1 of A Block competition, Tetsuya Naito suffered a legitimate knee injury in his match with Zack Sabre Jr., resulting in Naito having to withdraw from the tournament. All his remaining tournament matches were declared forfeits on Naito's part.

Notes

Aftermath 
On the final night of G1 Climax 31, Zack Sabre Jr. had an impromptu 5-minute, special exhibition grappling match with Katsuyori Shibata, marking Shibata's return to in-ring action since suffering a subdural hematoma at Sakura Genesis 2017, which put him out of action for over 4 years. The bout went to the time limit and no winner was declared. Afterwards, Shibata addressed the crowd, saying the next time he will step back into the ring, it will be in his ring gear, presumably in a sanctioned wrestling match. During the finals for World Tag League and Best of Super Juniors 28, Shibata would address the crowd, announcing his first official match since Sakura Genesis would take place on January 4, 2022, at Wrestle Kingdom 16.

In a press conference after winning the tournament, Okada proposed to NJPW chairman Naoki Sugabayashi to hold and defend the previous version of the IWGP Heavyweight Championship belt, seen from 2008–2021, instead of the usual briefcase which holds the Tokyo Dome IWGP World Heavyweight Championship challenge rights certificate. Sugabayashi accepted the proposal, and the former title belt returned to represent Okada's G1 win on the first show of the Road to Power Struggle tour. Okada would go on to beat Shingo Takagi on January 4 at Wrestle Kingdom 16, where he finally retired the 4th Generation title belt on his terms in the Tokyo Dome at the end of the night.

References

External links 
 G1 Climax official website 

New Japan Pro-Wrestling tournaments
New Japan Pro-Wrestling shows
2021 in professional wrestling
September 2021 events in Japan
October 2021 events in Japan